Martynas  is a Lithuanian masculine given name. It is a cognate of the English language name Martin.

List of people named as

Martynas Andriukaitis (1981–2014), Lithuanian professional basketball player
Martynas Andriuškevičius (born 1986), Lithuanian professional basketball player
Martynas Gecevičius (born 1988), Lithuanian professional basketball player currently playing for BC Lietuvos Rytas
Martynas Goštautas (1428–1483), nobleman from the Grand Duchy of Lithuania of Goštautai family
Martynas Jankus (1858–1946), social activist and publisher in East Prussia
Martynas Jurgilas (born 1988), track and field sprint athlete who competes internationally for Lithuania
Martynas Knakfusas or Marcin Knackfus (1742–1821), Polish–Lithuanian Neoclassical architect of German descent
Martynas Mažeika (born 1985), Lithuanian professional basketball player
Martynas Mažvydas (1510–1563), author and the editor of the first printed book in the Lithuanian language
Martynas Pocius (born 1986), Lithuanian professional basketball player
Martynas Počobutas or Marcin Odlanicki Poczobutt (1728–1810), Polish–Lithuanian Jesuit astronomer and mathematician
Martynas Švėgžda von Bekker (born 1967), Lithuanian violinist
Simonas Martynas Kosakovskis or Szymon Marcin Kossakowski (1741–1794), Polish-Lithuanian nobleman

See also
Martynas Mažvydas National Library of Lithuania, the national library of Lithuania on Gediminas Avenue in Vilnius
Martyn (disambiguation)
Martynia

Masculine given names
Lithuanian masculine given names